is a footballer who plays as a centre-back for Weymouth.

Club career
Matsuzaka joined Southend United as a youth, having previously played youth football for Crystal Palace, and played for the club in the FA Youth Cup. In 2014 he was loaned to Harlow Town for the remainder of the 2014–15 season, making nine appearances in the league and one in the play-offs. He was given the number 34 shirt at Southend for the 2015–16 season, and made his first team debut against Brighton & Hove Albion U23 in the EFL Trophy in August 2016, coming on as a sub in the 28th minute.

In May 2017 Southend announced Matsuzaka would have his contract extended, and he was given the number 28 shirt for the 2017–18 season.

On 1 August 2018, Matsuzaka signed for J3 League side Kataller Toyama. On 23 November 2018, it was announced that Matsuzaka's contract at Kataller would not be renewed and he would leave the club without making an appearance.

Matsuzaka joined Braintree Town on 18 January 2019. He subsequently signed for Sutton United in July 2019, before returning to Braintree in December. On 21 August 2020, Matsuzaka joined National League South side Oxford City.

In July 2022, Matsuzaka joined National League South side Weymouth.

International career
In 2015 Matsuzaka was called up to play for Japan U19, playing two friendly matches against Birmingham City U21 and Liverpool U21.

Personal life
Matsuzaka was born in London to a Japanese father and an English mother.

References

External links

Living people
1997 births
Japanese people of English descent
English people of Japanese descent
Japanese footballers
English footballers
Footballers from the London Borough of Barnet
Association football defenders
Japan youth international footballers
Isthmian League players
Southend United F.C. players
Harlow Town F.C. players
Braintree Town F.C. players
Sutton United F.C. players
Oxford City F.C. players